In statistics, Somers’ D, sometimes incorrectly referred to as Somer’s D, is a measure of ordinal association between two possibly dependent random variables  and . Somers’ D takes values between  when all pairs of the variables disagree and  when all pairs of the variables agree. Somers’ D is named after Robert H. Somers, who proposed it in 1962.

Somers’ D plays a central role in rank statistics and is the parameter behind many nonparametric methods. It is also used as a quality measure of binary choice or ordinal regression (e.g., logistic regressions) and credit scoring models.

Somers’ D for sample

Define Kendall tau rank correlation coefficient  as

 
 

As  quantifies the number of pairs with unequal  values, Somers’ D is the difference between the number of concordant and discordant pairs, divided by the number of pairs with  values in the pair being unequal.

Somers’ D for distribution

Let two independent bivariate random variables  and  have the same probability distribution .

 

or the difference between the probabilities of concordance and discordance. Thus,  is the difference between the two corresponding probabilities, conditional on the  values not being equal.
If  has a continuous probability distribution, then  and Kendall's tau and Somers’ D coincide. Somers’ D normalizes Kendall's tau for possible mass points of variable .

Somers' D for binary dependent variables

In practice, Somers' D is most often used when the dependent variable Y is a binary variable, i.e. for binary classification or prediction of binary outcomes including binary choice models in econometrics. Methods for fitting such models include logistic and probit regression.

Several statistics can be used to quantify the quality of such models: area under the receiver operating characteristic (ROC) curve, Goodman and Kruskal's gamma, Kendall's tau (Tau-a), Somers’ D, etc. Somers’ D is probably the most widely used of the available ordinal association statistics. Identical to the Gini coefficient, Somers’ D is related to the area under the receiver operating characteristic curve (AUC), 
.

 

where  is the number of neither concordant nor discordant pairs that are tied on variable  and not on variable .

Example

The number of concordant pairs equals 

The number of discordant pairs equals 

The number of pairs tied is equal to the total number of pairs minus the concordant and discordant pairs

Thus, Somers’ D equals

References

Nonparametric statistics
Independence (probability theory)